Rory Patrick Townsend (born 30 June 1995) is a British-born Irish cyclist, who currently rides for UCI ProTeam .

Major results

2017
 1st  Mountains classification, Tour of Almaty
 1st  Points classification, Tour of Quanzhou Bay
 2nd Midden–Brabant Poort Omloop
 4th Rutland–Melton CiCLE Classic
 9th Rad am Ring
2018
 8th Antwerpse Havenpijl
2019
 1st  Sprints classification, Tour of Britain
 1st Beaumont Trophy
 1st East Cleveland–Klondike GP
 1st Circuit of the Mendips
 Tour of Fuzhou
1st Stages 2 & 4
 1st Brooklands, Tour Series
 2nd Memorial Philippe Van Coningsloo
 3rd Classic Loire Atlantique
 3rd Heistse Pijl
 3rd Rutland–Melton CiCLE Classic
 4th Road race, National Road Championships
2021
 Tour de la Mirabelle
1st  Points classification 
1st Stage 1 
 9th Clàssica Comunitat Valenciana 1969
 9th Heistse Pijl
 10th Ronde van Limburg
2022
 1st  Road race, National Road Championships
 1st Omloop Mandel-Leie-Schelde
 6th Arno Wallaard Memorial

References

External links

1995 births
Living people
Irish cyclists